Midnight Run is a 1988 American road action comedy film directed by Martin Brest and starring Robert De Niro and Charles Grodin. Yaphet Kotto, John Ashton, Dennis Farina, Joe Pantoliano, and Philip Baker Hall play supporting roles.

At the 46th Golden Globe Awards, the film was nominated for Best Motion Picture – Musical or Comedy and Best Actor for De Niro. A critical and commercial success, the film was followed by The Midnight Run Action Pack in 1994, three made for television sequels which did not feature any of the principal actors, although a few characters are carried over from the first film.

Plot
Jack Walsh, a bounty hunter, is enlisted by bail bondsman Eddie Moscone to bring accountant Jonathan "The Duke" Mardukas back to Los Angeles. The accountant had embezzled $15 million from Chicago mob boss Jimmy Serrano before skipping on the $450,000 bail Moscone had posted for him. Walsh must bring Mardukas back within 5 days or Moscone defaults. 

Moscone says the job is easy, a "midnight run", but Walsh demands $100,000. Walsh is then approached by FBI officer Alonzo Mosely, who needs Mardukas to be a witness against Serrano, so orders him to keep away from him. 

Walsh takes no notice of this and instead steals Mosely's ID, which he uses to pass himself off as an FBI agent along his journey. Serrano’s henchmen Tony and Joey offer Walsh $1 million to turn Mardukas over to them, but he turns them down. 

Walsh captures Mardukas in New York and calls Moscone from the airport, not knowing that Moscone's line is being tapped by the FBI and that his assistant Jerry is secretly tipping off Serrano's men. However, Mardukas fakes a panic attack on the plane, forcing the two men to travel via train. When they fail to show up in Los Angeles on time, Moscone sends rival bounty hunter Marvin Dorfler to find them. 

Dorfler tracks them to the train and attempts to take The Duke from Walsh, but he gets the drop on him and leaves the train. When Walsh attempts to purchase bus tickets with a credit card, he discovers that Dorfler cancelled it. Without funds, he is forced to rely on other means to get across the country, including stealing cars, borrowing his ex-wife’s car in Chicago, and hitchhiking. 

Meanwhile, word of the skirmish on the train reaches Mosely's ears and he leads a task force to find Walsh and Mardukas. Walsh eventually reveals that he was working as an undercover officer in Chicago 10 years ago; trying to get close to a drug dealer who had almost the entire police force on his payroll. 

Eventually, just as Walsh was going to bust the dealer, corrupt cops planted heroin in his house. To avoid both going to prison and working for the dealer, Walsh resigned from the force, left Chicago and became a bounty hunter. His wife divorced him and married a corrupt lieutenant. However, Walsh has clung to the vain hope that his ex-wife will reunite with him. 

Later, Mardukas learns that the drug dealer was Serrano. In Arizona, Dorfler takes him away from Walsh, who is found by Mosely. While arguing with Moscone over the phone, Walsh realizes that Dorfler intends to turn Mardukas over to Serrano for $2 million. However, Dorfler accidentally reveals to Serrano's men where he is keeping Mardukas so is knocked unconscious by them, who then go after Mardukas themselves. 

Walsh bluffs Serrano's men that he has computer disks created by Mardukas with enough information to put Serrano away, but promises to hand them over if he hands him over unharmed. He then makes a deal to deliver Serrano to the FBI in exchange for being allowed to take Mardukas back. Walsh meets up with Serrano while wearing a wire and being watched by the FBI. Dorfler spots Mardukas and interrupts the exchange, unknowingly disabling the wire. After Serrano takes the disks, the FBI closes in, arresting Serrano and his henchmen. Mosely turns Mardukas over to Walsh with enough time to return him to Los Angeles by the deadline. 

However, Walsh realizes that he cannot bring himself to send Mardukas to prison, and lets him go scot-free. Before parting, Walsh gives a watch that his wife gave him before their marriage, to Mardukas; symbolizing he has finally let her go. In return, Mardukas gives Walsh $300,000 in a money belt he had been hiding, clarifying that it is a gift, as he let him leave. Walsh flags down a cab and asks the driver if he has change for a $1,000 bill, but the taxi drives away, so Walsh heads home on foot.

Cast

Production
After completing The Untouchables, De Niro wanted to try something different and decided on appearing in a comedy. He pursued the lead role in Penny Marshall's film, Big. Marshall was interested, but the studio was not, so the role went to Tom Hanks. Martin Brest, who directed Beverly Hills Cop, had developed a script with George Gallo that blended elements of comedy and action.

Gallo says he based the relationship between Jack and the Duke on his own parents. "I don't think they ever realized how funny they were when they were arguing about something," he said. "My father was very emotional whereas my mother was far more calculating. She would let him talk and lead him down alleys and then strike like a cat."

Gallo paid tribute to Martin Brest, saying "Marty was highly focused, where I was a bit more all over the place. I'm not a person who suffers from not having ideas. If anything, I have too many ideas. Marty helped rein me in to stay focused on the main story. This has helped me a great deal since my collaboration with him."

Paramount Pictures was originally interested in backing Midnight Run, but they wanted a big name star opposite De Niro in order to improve the film's chances at the box office. Their production executives suggested that the Mardukas character be changed to a woman and wanted Cher for the role in the hope she would provide some "sexual overtones." When Brest rejected the idea, Paramount suggested teaming De Niro up with Robin Williams, who became eager to get the role and offered to audition for Brest. At one stage Bruce Willis was mentioned as a possible co star.

Brest was impressed by Grodin's audition with De Niro, however, feeling that there was a real chemistry between the two actors. As a result, Paramount backed out and their UIP partner Universal Studios became interested in the project. Paramount president Ned Tanen claimed that the budget became too high and he decided that "it wasn't worth it." Universal executive Casey Silver had worked with Brest on Beverly Hills Cop and he was integral in setting up the project at Universal.

To research for his role, De Niro worked with real-life bounty hunters and police officers. As Walsh uncuffs Mardukas on the train, the latter says, "Thanks, 'cause they're starting to cut into my wrists.'" In fact, Grodin had permanent scars resulting from the handcuffs he had to wear for most of the film. The scene where Mardukas falls off a cliff was shot on location in the Salt River Canyon in White Mountain, Arizona and the conclusion, taking place in rapids, was shot in New Zealand because the water was too cold in Arizona.

"I trusted Marty would choose the material that was most suited for the scene," said De Niro. "He's aware of everything in Chuck's style, in my style. He had to balance all that, and I think he did it very well."

Yaphet Kotto remembered the film being a difficult shoot.
De Niro is very spontaneous and it always helps to work with an artist like that. But Marty Brest! "Herr Director" shot so many takes of the scenes that I lost all joy in doing the film. It became hard and tedious work. Then he stopped eating during the shoot and became thinner and thinner each day, until he looked like a ghost behind the camera. When I met Marty at the Universal studio with De Niro, he looked healthy and strong, but as filming went on, he began to turn into someone you'd see in Dachau. It was weird. I got sick and for the whole of the film I had a fever and was under the weather for most of it ... I was shocked when it came off so funny ... It sure wasn't funny making it.
Universal invested $15 million in a print and television advertising campaign.

Soundtrack
The film's score was composed by Danny Elfman, and the album was released by MCA Records.
 Walsh Gets the Duke (1:47)
 Main Titles (2:21)
 Stairway Chase (:54)
 J.W. Gets a Plan (1:41)
 Gears Spin I (:54)
 Dorfler's Theme (1:24)
 F.B.I. (1:16)
 Package Deal (1:07)
 Mobocopter (2:42)
 Freight Train Hop (1:18)
 Drive to Red's (1:04)
 In the Next Life (1:06)
 The River (1:19)
 The Wild Ride (1:31)
 Amarillo Dawn (:26)
 Potato Walk (1:09)
 Desert Run (1:09)
 Diner Blues (1:19)
 Dorfler's Problem (1:01)
 Gears Spin II (1:30)
 The Confrontation (2:30)
 The Longest Walk (1:32)
 Walsh Frees the Duke (2:44)
 End Credits: "Try to Believe" – Mosley & The B-Men (4:16)

Note: The end credits track as heard in the film is instrumental.
"Try To Believe" was redone on Oingo Boingo's Dark at the End of the Tunnel album.

Reception

Box office
Midnight Run was released on July 20, 1988, in 1,158 theaters, grossing US$5.5 million in its opening weekend. It went on to make $38.4 million in North America and $43.2 million in the rest of the world for a worldwide total of $81.6 million.

Critical response
On Rotten Tomatoes the film holds an approval rating of 95% based on 56 reviews, with an average rating of 8/10. The site's critics consensus reads, "Enlivened by the antagonistic chemistry between Robert De Niro and Charles Grodin, Midnight Run is an uncommonly entertaining odd couple comedy." Metacritic assigned the film a weighted average score of 78 out of 100, based on 16 critics, indicating "generally favorable reviews". Audiences polled by CinemaScore gave the film an average grade of "A" on an A+ to F scale.

Film critic Roger Ebert gave the film 3.5 out of 4 stars and wrote, "What Midnight Run does with these two characters is astonishing, because it's accomplished within the structure of a comic thriller ... It's rare for a thriller to end with a scene of genuinely moving intimacy, but this one does, and it earns it." In his review for The Globe and Mail, Jay Scott praised the performances: "De Niro has the time of his acting life lightening up and sending up all those raging bulls that won him all those Oscars ... Charles Grodin, master of the double-take and maestro of the slow burn, the best light character comic since Jack Benny stopped playing himself". Vincent Canby, in his review for The New York Times, wrote, "Mr. De Niro and Mr. Grodin are lunatic delights, which is somewhat more than can be said for the movie, whose mechanics keep getting in the way of the performances". In his review for The Washington Post, Hal Hinson says of the director that, "carrying the dead weight of George Gallo's script, Brest isn't up to the strenuous task of transforming his uninspired genre material in  something deeper, and so the attempts to mix pathos with comedy strike us merely as wild and disorienting vacillations in tone". David Ansen, in his review for Newsweek, wrote, "The outline of George Gallo's script—odd-couple antagonists become buddies under perilous circumstances—was stale five years ago, and the outcome offers no surprises. Too bad: a lot of good work has been wasted on an unworthy cause".

Legacy

Thirty years on, critics have warmed to the movie. Alan Sepinwall calls it the "Casablanca of Buddy Comedies" in Rolling Stone:

Yet all that ultimately matters---and makes the movie a classic worth revisiting on the 30th anniversary of its release---are two other words: Walsh and Duke.

George Gallo put the success of the movie down to the relationship between Jack and the Duke.
In many ways it is a love story, although it is one that is short-lived. They meet each other, take an instant dislike to one another and over time grow to respect each other which leads to deeper feelings. Both men realize, despite their differences, that they share core beliefs of what is right and wrong. Audiences also think that the road trip angle to the story rings true. Everyone who has ever gone on a long road trip knows that things can go wrong and, as a result, adults can be reduced to behaving like children. No matter how well a script is written, it has to be fully realized by the director and actors. Every last person working on the film did a terrific job.
De Niro attributed a lot of the film's eventual success to Charles Grodin. "The way Chuck Grodin is, it worked," he said. "His character was irritating and Chuck knew how to do that, to work that. I felt like that was a good way to go."

Sequels

Film 

On November 8, 2021, it was announced that Universal Pictures was developing a sequel to star Regina Hall with De Niro attached as a producer.

Television 
 Another Midnight Run
 Midnight Runaround
 Midnight Run for Your Life

See also
 List of American films of 1988

References

External links

 
 
 
 
 
 

1988 films
1988 action films
1988 comedy films
1988 crime films
1980s action comedy films
1980s buddy comedy films
1980s chase films
1980s comedy road movies
1980s crime comedy films
1980s English-language films
American action comedy films
American buddy comedy films
American chase films
American comedy road movies
American crime comedy films
American comedy thriller films
Films directed by Martin Brest
Films scored by Danny Elfman
Films set in Arizona
Films shot in Arizona
Films shot in Michigan
Films shot in New Zealand
Universal Pictures films
Works about bounty hunters
1980s American films